Cracked Up is a 1987 American TV film starring Ed Asner.

It was one of the first films about the crack cocaine epidemic.

Cast
Edward Asner as Vincent Owens
Raphael Sbarge as Chris Mcnally
James Wilder as John Owens
Marilyn Jones as Terri Sandusky
Richard Holden as Ed Sandusky
Kim Delaney as Jackie
H. Richard Greene as Coach Frank Malvin
F J O'Neil as Dr Carl Eckhart
Terence Alexander as Wilbert Fletcher

Production
In 1986 a special aired on American TV called 48 Hours on Crack Street. A few weeks later, in October, Aaron Spelling Productions approached writer-producer Peter Lefcourt to make a crack-related projected. "They wanted it to be the first crack movie on," Lefcourt said. "Crack is hot."

The first draft was delivered in January 1987. Filming started on 9 March and the show aired in May.

"I didn't want to make another 48 Hours on Crack Street," said Lefcourt. "Movies have been made about cocaine, and they are so predictable. After a while, the audience's eyes glaze over. They know the kids are going to get screwed up and their parents are going to tear their hair out."

"We hope we've addressed this realistically," said director Karen Arthur. "We want to appeal to the youth audience and hope that through this film, kids who are contemplating putting this stuff in their throats, or have, will gain some courage not to, or to stop."

References

External links
Cracked Up at TCMDB
Cracked Up at IMDb
Complete film at Internet Archive
Review in The Washington Post
Review in The New York Times
Review in Los Angeles Times

1987 television films
1987 films
ABC network original films
Films about drugs
Films directed by Karen Arthur